Daniel Henning Hartvig (born 4 August 1996) is a track cyclist from Denmark. In 2015 he competed at the 2015 UCI Track Cycling World Championships in the men's team pursuit. He won the bronze medal in the team pursuit at the 2015 UEC European Track Championships in Grenchen, Switzerland.

Major results
2015
 3rd  Team pursuit, UEC European Track Championships

References

1996 births
Danish male cyclists
Living people
Place of birth missing (living people)
Danish track cyclists